Angie is the debut album by American R&B singer Angela Bofill. It was produced by the GRP Records label heads Dave Grusin and Larry Rosen. It was released in 1978 on the GRP label; a digitally remastered version was released on Buddah Records in 2001.

Reception

The album was heralded as a mild success, popularizing on some of the themes of the times. The song "This Time I'll Be Sweeter" charted fairly well on the U.S R&B front. Being the first of her kind to do so, Bofill's sophisticated vocals would prove to have an effect on the jazz, Latin and urban contemporary music audiences of the time.

Track listing
All tracks composed by Angela Bofill; except where noted.
 "Under the Moon and Over the Sky" - 5:45
 "This Time I'll Be Sweeter" -  (Gwen Guthrie, Patrick Grant)  4:21
 "Baby, I Need Your Love" - 4:14
 "Rough Times" -  (Ashford & Simpson)  4:41
 "The Only Thing I Would Wish For" - 4:26
 "Summer Days" - (Timothy Blixseth) 5:09
 "Share Your Love" -  (Derrik Hoitsma)  5:14
 "Children of the World United" - 5:51

Personnel
 Angela Bofill - lead and backing vocals
 Dave Grusin - electric piano, piano, percussion
 Eric Gale - electric guitar
 Buddy Williams, Steve Gadd - drums
 Dave Valentin - flute, bass guitar
 Richard Resnicoff - acoustic guitar
 George Young - alto saxophone on "Share Your World"
 Ralph MacDonald - Roger Squitero - percussion
 Eddie Daniels, George Young, Howard Johnson, Jim Pugh, Irvin "Marky" Markowitz, Marvin Stamm, Michael Brecker, Phil Bodner, Walt Levinsky - horns
 Barry Finclair, Charles Libove, Charles McCracken, Diana Halprin, Emanuel Vardi, Harry Cykman, John Pintavalle, Jonathan Abramowitz, Lamar Alsop, Matthew Raimondi, Max Ellen, Paul Gershman, Richard Sortomme - strings
 Arthur Woodley, Cheryl Freeman, Clara Antoine, Dance Theater of Harlem Choral Ensemble, Irma LaGuerre, Lorraine Baucum, Raj McIntyre, Stacy Gaines, Sylvia Bhourne, Wilbur Archie - choir
 David Nadien - concertmaster
 Gwen Guthrie, Patti Austin,  Vivian Cherry - backing vocals
"This album is dedicated to my little nephew Pas and to all the children of the world. . .that they grow up knowing the true meaning of love."

Covers and samples
 Chilean hip hop band Makiza samples "The Only Thing I Would Wish For" in the song "La Rosa de los Vientos".
 American rapper Smoke DZA samples "Under the Moon and Over the Sky" on the track "Pass Off," from the album Dream. Zone. Achieve.

Charts

Singles

References

External links
 Angela Bofill - Angie at Discogs

1978 debut albums
Albums produced by Dave Grusin
Albums recorded at Electric Lady Studios
Angela Bofill albums
GRP Records albums